The 31st Goya Awards were presented at the Madrid Marriott Auditorium Hotel in Madrid on 4 February 2017 to honour the best in Spanish films of 2016. Actor and comedian Dani Rovira was the master of ceremonies for the third time in a row.

Nominations were announced on 14 December 2016 by Javier Cámara and Natalia de Molina. A Monster Calls received the most nominations with twelve, followed by Smoke & Mirrors and The Fury of a Patient Man with eleven nominations each.

The Fury of a Patient Man won Best Film, as well as Best Supporting Actor, Best Original Screenplay and Best New Director, but A Monster Calls won the most awards, with nine awards, including Best Director. Actress Emma Suárez won two awards on the same night: Best Actress for Julieta and Best Supporting Actress for La próxima piel.

Winners and nominees

Major awards

Other award nominees

Honorary Goya
Ana Belén

References

External links
Official site

31
2016 film awards
2016 in Spanish cinema
2017 in Madrid
February 2017 events in Spain